Anactinia may refer to:
 Anactinia (cnidarian), a genus of cnidarians in the family Arachnactidae
 Anactinia, a genus of plants in the family Asteraceae; synonym of Nardophyllum